Sheena Shirley Easton (born 27 April 1959) is a Scottish singer and actress. She came into the public eye in an episode of the first British musical reality television series The Big Time: Pop Singer, which recorded her attempts to gain a record deal and her eventual signing with the EMI label. Easton's first two singles, "Modern Girl" and "9 to 5" (later released as "Morning Train (Nine to Five)" in the United States), both entered the Top 10 of the UK Singles Chart simultaneously. She became one of the most successful British female recording artists of the 1980s.
 
A six-time Grammy Award nominee, Easton is a two-time winner, winning the award for Best New Artist in 1982 and Best Mexican-American Performance in 1985 for her duet with Mexican singer Luis Miguel on the 1984 single "Me Gustas Tal Como Eres". She has recorded 15 studio albums, released a total of 55 singles and had 20 consecutive US singles, including 15 Top 40 hits, seven Top 10's and one number-one hit on the Billboard Hot 100 between 1981 and 1991. She has received five RIAA-certified Gold albums and one Platinum album. In Canada, she scored three Gold albums and two Platinum albums. With 25 Top 40 international hit singles, Easton has sold over 40 million records worldwide.

Easton became the first and only recording artist in Billboard history to have a Top 5 hit on each of Billboards primary singles charts: "Morning Train (Nine to Five)" (Pop and Adult Contemporary), "We've Got Tonight" with Kenny Rogers (Country and Adult Contemporary) and "Sugar Walls" (R&B and Dance).

Easton's other hit singles include the James Bond-theme "For Your Eyes Only", "You Could Have Been with Me", "Telefone (Long Distance Love Affair)", "Almost Over You", "Strut", "U Got the Look" and "The Arms of Orion" with Prince, "The Lover in Me" and "What Comes Naturally". She has worked with prominent singers, writers and producers, such as Prince, Christopher Neil, Kenny Rogers, David Foster, Luis Miguel, L.A. Reid, Babyface, Patrice Rushen and Nile Rodgers.

Life and career

1959–1980: Early life and career beginnings
Sheena Shirley Orr was born on 27 April 1959, at Bellshill Maternity Hospital in North Lanarkshire, Scotland, the youngest of six children of Annie and steel mill labourer Alex Orr. She has two brothers, Robert and Alex, and three sisters, Marilyn, Anessa, and Morag. Her earliest-known public performance as a singer was in 1964 at the age of five, when she sang "Early One Morning" for her uncle and aunt and various relatives at the couple's 25th wedding anniversary celebration.

Easton's father died in 1969 and her mother had to support the family. According to Easton's website, despite her mother's heavy workload she was always available for her children: "Sheena always speaks very highly of her mum and the wonderful job she did in bringing up her and her siblings, including teaching them all to read at home before they were even enrolled in school."

Easton did not consider a singing career until she saw the movie The Way We Were, with Barbra Streisand. Streisand's singing over the opening credits "overtook" the young girl and convinced her that what she wanted most was to be a singer and to have the same effect on others.

Her top grades in school earned her a scholarship to attend the Royal Scottish Academy of Music and Drama in Glasgow, where she trained from 1975 to 1979 as a speech and drama teacher by day, while singing with a band called "Something Else" by night at local clubs. She chose to study teaching rather than performing, because it was a course of study that would let her perfect her craft as a singer.

In 1979, she married Sandi Easton, the first of her four husbands. They divorced after eight months, and Sheena decided to keep the surname Easton. That year, one of her tutors coaxed her into auditioning for Esther Rantzen, producer of the BBC programme The Big Time. Rantzen was planning a documentary film to chronicle a relative unknown's rise to pop-music stardom. Easton was selected as the subject for the programme; EMI executives awarded her a contract, and Christopher Neil was assigned as her recording producer. Deke Arlon became her first manager, and Easton spent much of 1980 being followed by camera crews, who filmed her throughout the process of her audition through to making her first EMI single, "Modern Girl". In the course of the filming, she met and sang for Dorothy Squires, Dusty Springfield and Lulu, whose manager Marion Massey told her that she saw Easton as a potential TV star with her own series, but not as a pop singer for the 1980s as she lacked "rugged individuality".

The encounter with Massey (then Marion London), at which Lulu was present, was filmed and included in the broadcast, at which time Massey was not entirely incorrect, as "Modern Girl" had flopped on its release, peaking at number 56 in just three weeks on the UK Singles Chart in April 1980. However, once the programme aired in August 1980, "Modern Girl" was reissued and the track and its follow up "Nine to Five" both leapt into the top 10, disproving Massey's prediction. In a revised and extended version of this episode of The Big Time, broadcast in 1981; this special concluded with news of Easton's breaking into the American market.

1981–1982: "9 to 5", James Bond, Take My Time
Easton's first single, the disco-tinged soft-synth-pop tune, "Modern Girl", was released in the UK before The Big Time aired, reaching number 56. At the end of the show, Easton was still unsure of her future as a singer. The question was resolved soon after the show aired, when her second single, "9 to 5", reached number 3 on the UK Singles Chart and was certified a Gold single in 1980. "Modern Girl" re-entered the chart subsequently and climbed into the top 10, being certified a Silver single, and Easton found herself with two songs in the UK top 10 simultaneously. During 1980, Easton was voted "Best British Female Singer" by the Daily Mirror Pop & Rock Awards, "Best Newcomer" by Capital Radio, and "Best Female Singer" by the TV Times Readers Awards.

"9 to 5" was Easton's first single release in the United States, although it was renamed "Morning Train (Nine To Five)" for its release in the US and Canada to avoid confusion with Dolly Parton's hit movie title song "9 to 5". "Morning Train (Nine to Five)" became Easton's first and only number 1 hit in the US and topped both the Billboard Hot 100 and Adult Contemporary charts in Billboard magazine. "Modern Girl" was released as the follow-up and peaked at number 18, and before 1981 was over she had a Top 10 hit in both the US and UK with the Academy Award-nominated James Bond movie theme "For Your Eyes Only". The song was nominated for an Academy Award and Golden Globe award in 1982 in the category "Best Music (Original Song)". Easton's US success culminated in her winning the Grammy Award for "Best New Artist" for 1982. Easton actually appears in the opening credits of For Your Eyes Only, performing the song; as of 2022, she remains the only Bond theme singer to be featured in this way.

Easton's first three US albums, Sheena Easton (1981) (retitled edition of Take My Time), You Could Have Been with Me (1981), and Madness, Money & Music (1982), were all in the same soft rock/pop vein. The title track from You Could Have Been with Me made it in to the US top 15; however, by the end of 1982, she saw her sales slumping. Easton was one of the first artists to record "Wind Beneath My Wings" (included on Madness, Money & Music), which later was a hit for Bette Midler.

Then, in 1982, Easton undertook her first US tour. Her performance in Los Angeles was videotaped and broadcast on HBO and later released on VHS and Laserdisc as Sheena Easton Live at the Palace, Hollywood.

On 8 November 1982 she appeared in the Royal Variety Performance in front of the Queen Mother singing Maybe This Time.

1983–1987: Best Kept Secret, Todo Me Recuerda a Ti, A Private Heaven and No Sound but a Heart

In January 1983, Easton duetted with Kenny Rogers and had a top 10 hit in the US with "We've Got Tonight", a cover of the Bob Seger song. The recording also earned her a number 1 single on the Country chart, and it reached the UK Top 30. Around the time of her hit record with Rogers, Easton headlined Act One, a one-hour variety special broadcast on NBC that featured Rogers and a cameo appearance by Johnny Carson.

October 1983 saw the release of the album Best Kept Secret and its first single, the synthesized dance-pop tune "Telefone (Long Distance Love Affair)", became her fourth Top 10 hit. The single was Grammy-nominated for "Best Female Pop Vocal Performance" of 1983. The follow-up single, "Almost Over You", reached the US Top 30 and was a number 4 AC chart hit. "Almost Over You" was very popular in Asia and was covered by Chinese singer Cass Pang. It also became a hit on the Country charts for Lila McCann in 1998.

In 1984, Easton recorded a Spanish-language single, "Me Gustas Tal Como Eres" ("I Like You Just the Way You Are"), a duet with Mexican star Luis Miguel. The single earned her a second Grammy, this time for Best Mexican-American Performance. The track was taken from the album Todo Me Recuerda a Ti (1984), and reissued by Capitol/EMI-Latin in 1989, which featured Spanish-language covers of seven previous Easton recordings and three new tracks. In the same year, she also made a transformation into a sexy dance-pop siren, changing her performance style in the process. She was rewarded with the biggest-selling US album of her career, RIAA certified gold & platinum A Private Heaven (1984), and her sixth Top 10 US single, "Strut". In the UK, however, the move was not a commercial success, as Easton would find herself shut out of the UK top 75 for the next three years.

Her career on the rise in the US, Easton was again Grammy nominated, this time for "Best Female Pop Vocal Performance" in 1984. She was also one of the first artists to have a music video banned because of its lyrics rather than its imagery; some broadcasters refused to air the sexually risqué "Sugar Walls", which had been written for her by Prince (using the pseudonym Alexander Nevermind). "Sugar Walls" was named by Tipper Gore of the Parents Music Resource Center as one of the "Filthy Fifteen", a list of songs deemed indecent because of their lyrics, alongside Prince's own "Darling Nikki". The song eventually hit number 3 on the R&B singles chart, number 9 on the Billboard Hot 100, and number 1 on the Billboard Dance Chart in 1985.

Easton's follow-up to A Private Heaven, entitled Do You (1985), was produced by Nile Rodgers and achieved gold status, although it failed to generate any breakout singles of the chart calibre of "Strut" or "Sugar Walls". In late 1985, Easton contributed "It's Christmas (All Over the World)" to the holiday release Santa Claus: The Movie. In 1987, the release of a follow-up album, No Sound But a Heart (1987), was hampered in the United States after an initial single release, "Eternity" (another Prince composition), failed to reach the pop, R&B or adult contemporary charts. The album's release moved from February to June; then in August the release was further held up as Easton's attorneys asked that the album be delayed after EMI Records was absorbed into EMI/Manhattan. (This did not prevent the album from being released in Canada, Europe and other territories.)

Songs from the album were covered by other artists: Crystal Gayle and Gary Morris featured "Wanna Give My Love" and "What if We Fall in Love" on a 1987 duet album named for the latter song; Celine Dion recorded "The Last to Know" on 1990's Unison while Mexican singer Yuri featured the tune on her album Espejos De Alma (1995); Patti LaBelle covered "Still in Love" on 1989's Be Yourself; Pia Zadora recorded "Floating Hearts" on 1989's Pia Z. No Sound But a Heart eventually did get released in the United States in 1999, with four bonus tracks, including Easton's contributions to the soundtrack of the 1986 film About Last Night, "Natural Love" and the Top 50 single "So Far, So Good".

1987–1990: "U Got the Look" and The Lover in Me 
In 1987, Easton appeared in Prince's concert film Sign o' the Times, during which she sang duet vocals for Prince's hit, "U Got the Look", which became a number 2 hit in the US. This led to Grammy nominations for "Best R&B Vocal, Duo or Group" and "Best R&B Song" of 1987. The track also returned Easton to the UK hit parade for the first time in nearly four years, although Easton is not credited on the label for the song's single release. During her time collaborating with Prince, Easton was encouraged to write her own material. The most successful effort from their co-writes was "The Arms of Orion", another duet with Prince and a single from 1989's Batman soundtrack. The song reached number 36 on the US Billboard Chart and number 27 in her native UK. She also co-wrote the song "Love '89" with Prince for Patti LaBelle's album Be Yourself and "La, La, La, He, He, Hee", which Prince recorded for the B-side of the single "Sign o' the Times". Tabloid press linked the two romantically, which she has always denied.

In November 1987, Easton made her first dramatic acting appearance on the television program Miami Vice. She played a singer named Caitlin Davies, whom Sonny Crockett was assigned to protect until her court appearance to render crucial testimony against certain corrupt music industry mavens. Sonny and Caitlin ended up married by the end of the episode, the first of five episodes for Easton.

By the spring of 1988, a volume of the Miami Vice soundtrack was released and featured "Follow My Rainbow", which Easton had finished singing on her last appearance just moments before her character was eliminated.

The song also appeared on her next album The Lover in Me (1988), RIAA gold-disc debut released the following autumn on her new label MCA Records, that put Easton back on the US and UK charts after the release of No Sound But a Heart was cancelled in the US. This album features Urban R&B and Dance-pop, and a sexier image. The title song from The Lover in Me reached number 2 on the Billboard Hot 100 and UK number 15 and became her biggest pop hit since "Morning Train". It also became a number 5 hit on the US Hot R&B/Hip-Hop Singles and Tracks chart. It was followed on the US R&B chart by "Days Like This" (number 35), which missed the Billboard Hot 100. The third single, the Prince-penned "101", made it to number 2 on the Billboard Dance chart. A final single was released "No Deposit, No Return" and failed to chart. The album received positive reviews and featured collaborations with L.A. Reid and Babyface, Prince, Angela Winbush and Jellybean Benitez.

In 1990, Easton revisited her home country of Scotland to perform at a festival (The Big Day) in Glasgow. After announcing that it was "good to be back home" in an American accent, she had bottles (some containing urine) thrown at her and, visibly shaken, she was forced to cut her set short. She vowed never to perform in Scotland again.

1991–1996: What Comes Naturally, Modern Girl (Live in San Diego), No Strings, and My Cherie 
In 1991, What Comes Naturally became the last of Easton's albums to chart in the United States, peaking at number 90. The title song was also her last Top 40 single to date, reaching number 19. It also became her first hit in Australia since the mid-1980s, peaking at number 4. Two other singles, "You Can Swing It" and "To Anyone," followed but failed to chart. "What Comes Naturally" remained on the US pop chart for 10 weeks and 11 weeks on the ARIA Chart in Australia. Easton has songwriting credits on three tracks. She is also one of the few pop artists to adopt the new jack swing sound with chart success from the early 1990s.

In 1992 an unofficial recording of "Modern Girl" (Live in San Diego) was released by "That's Life" recordings in Germany and Japan. The music was from her early output with EMI and became a sort of bootleg version of her concert when she performed stateside on her first worldwide tour in 1982.

Easton followed this with the non-charting but critically acclaimed No Strings (1993), an album of jazz standards produced by Patrice Rushen. It included her version of "The Nearness of You," which was also featured on the soundtrack of the film, Indecent Proposal, in which Easton appeared in a cameo role.

My Cherie (1995) was her last pop album to date to see domestic release in the United States. The album saw Sheena reunite with producer Christopher Neil for the first time in over a decade.

1996–1999: Freedom, Home and Colors of Christmas Tour 
Easton contributed vocals to the soundtrack of All Dogs Go to Heaven 2 and voiced the character Sasha La Fleur on "Count Me Out" and "I Will Always Be With You". Easton also contributed the theme song "Are There Angels" to the soundtrack for Shiloh in 1997; and provided the song "A Dream Worth Keeping" for the 1992 animated film FernGully: The Last Rainforest.

In 1997, she played 'Melissa McCammon', a recording star, who is visited by time travellers from the future in a second-season episode of the Canadian television series The Outer Limits entitled "Falling Star". The episode featured her singing two songs from My Cherie.

In the late 1990s, Easton retained an album contract with MCA Japan and released two discs of new material. However, neither album was originally released in the United States. Freedom, released in 1997 to coincide with the launch of her website and finally released in (Limited Edition) stateside in 2007, was a return to her trademark pop, including a remake of her debut single "Modern Girl".

In 1999 Universal/Victor released the self-produced acoustic set, Home. Also around this time, Sheena Easton Greatest Hits collection featuring 12 MCA singles recorded from 1988 to 1995 released and charted in Japan at number 98 (additional greatest hits collections surfaced in the US and UK, but did not chart).

Easton adopted a boy (Jake) and girl (Skylar) between 1995 and 1996. Motherhood led her to curtail her appearances and focus on casino gigs, corporate shows and theatrical work. "Because I adopted my children, I could plan my timing", she told The Arizona Republic. "I knew exactly when they were coming along, so I knew when I had to change my life so it would be a stable life."

Easton continued acting in America, starring in lead Broadway revivals of Man of La Mancha as (Aldonza) opposite Raul Julia in his last stage role (1992), and Grease as Rizzo (1996). Between 1994 and 1996, she played several characters in Gargoyles the animated series, including Lady Finella, the Banshee, Molly and Robyn Canmore. In 1999, she voice-acted a part-demon character, Annah-of-the-Shadows, in the computer game Planescape: Torment. She lives in Las Vegas with her two children and often performs in various casinos' entertainment venues. She voiced the character of Fiona Canmore for a scripted but unfinished episode of the cancelled animated feature, Team Atlantis.

In December 1998, Easton toured with "The Colors of Christmas" with artists Roberta Flack, Melissa Manchester, Peabo Bryson and Jeffrey Osborne. Windham Hill Records produced "The Colors of Christmas" disc by Robbie Buchanan of holiday music. Easton contributed two tracks, "The Place Where We Belong" (a duet with Jeffrey Osborne) and "The Lord's Prayer".

1999–2013: Fabulous, Re-issues
In 1999 New York based One Way Records reserved the rights to release all of Easton's EMI-America catalog. For the first time in the US, No Sound But a Heart was released, 12 years after the album was made available elsewhere. All of Easton's EMI back catalogue (with another exception of her Spanish-language album Todo Me Recuerda a Ti) was re-released and remastered with bonus tracks, incorporating B-sides and remixes.

Universal Japan released Best Ballads, a disc of ballads from her six previous albums from her MCA catalog with the exception of "For Your Eyes Only" for the Japanese market that failed to chart.

She also signed an album contract with Universal International UK and attempted a comeback with Fabulous (2000), an album of classic disco covers. The first single, "Giving Up, Giving In", reached UK number 54, and the album charted at UK number 185. A second single, a cover of Donna Summer's hit "Love is in Control", with double A-side "Don't Leave Me This Way", was withdrawn. This was to be Easton's last album release to date. The album was released throughout Europe, Japan, Australia, and Argentina but not in the US. In Australia, "Fabulous" was released 24 February 2001 and Easton was asked to perform songs from the album to close out 2001 Sydney Gay and Lesbian Mardi Gras ceremonies.

In 2003, Easton contributed vocals to "If You're Happy", a cover for a Japanese disc called Cover Morning Musume-Hello Project. She also began to host Vegas Live, a talk show with Clint Holmes (later replaced by Brian McKnight). In 2004, she was inducted into the Casino Legends Hall of Fame at the Tropicana Resort & Casino.

2013–present: "The Spy Who Loved Me" and 42nd Street

In February 2013, Demon/Edsel Records (UK) reissued Easton's You Could Have Been with Me and Madness, Money & Music along with A Private Heaven and Do You in two compact disc packages remastered with bonus tracks, with the latter including the extended version of "Jimmy Mack" that has never been included on any of her reissues. In November 2014, a box set of Easton's first five albums in an original album series CD collection was released by Warner Music in the United Kingdom.

In 2015 Easton embarked on symphony concerts with guest vocalists entitled "The Spy Who Loved Me" with material from spy movies of the past and present and featuring Bond-style music with symphonies around the United States beginning in San Francisco from July 2015 and continuing into 2016. Easton also performed a small tour of dates during the latter part of 2015 in Australia featuring her Greatest Hits.

In November 2016, Easton accepted the role of Dorothy Brock in the revival production of 42nd Street, which premiered on 20 March 2017 in London's West End, Drury Lane. Lulu replaced Easton in March 2018.

Easton performed at the 2021 New York State Fair, and two of her albums, Fabulous and an expanded edition of What Comes Naturally were reissued digitally through Apple Music.

On Sept. 17, 2021, RT Industries (US) and Cherry Red Records (UK) launch a re-issue campaign of the EMI star's back catalog and issued the three-CD box set The Definitive Singles 1980–1987, which collected all of Easton's English-language singles recorded for EMI, along with format-edit versions and some previously unreleased vault material along with the additional releases throughout 2022. On Nov. 19, 2021, Apple Music made additional Easton material available digitally, with the collections Best Ballads and Greatest Hits, which feature material from Easton's post-1987 era with MCA/Universal. In 2022, Cherry Red released the soundtrack to her 1982 TV special Live at the Palace, Hollywood on CD for the first time, along with the first DVD release of the show.

Personal life
Easton has been married, and divorced, four times and has two adopted children. Her first marriage was in Britain to Sandi Easton at the age of 19. The marriage lasted eight months. Sandi Easton died in 1998, aged 48.

Her second marriage in 1984 to Rob Light, a talent agent, ended after 18 months. Easton became a US citizen in 1992, carrying dual citizenship with the United Kingdom, and adopted her first child, Jake Rion Cousins Easton, in 1994. Two years later, she adopted again, this time a baby girl she named Skylar. In the summer of 1997, she met producer Tim Delarm while filming an episode of ESPN Canon Photo Safari in Yellowstone National Park and they married in Las Vegas in July 1997; the marriage lasted one year. On 9 November 2002, she married John Minoli, a Beverly Hills plastic surgeon; they divorced in 2003.

Easton resides in Henderson, Nevada.

Discography

Take My Time (1981; titled simply Sheena Easton in North America)
You Could Have Been with Me (1981)
Madness, Money & Music (1982)
Best Kept Secret (1983)
A Private Heaven (1984)
Todo Me Recuerda a Ti (1984) 
Do You (1985)
No Sound But a Heart (1987)
The Lover in Me (1988)
What Comes Naturally (1991)
No Strings (1993)
My Cherie (1995)
Freedom (1997)
Home (1999)
Fabulous (2000)
Live at the Palace, Hollywood (2022) - first soundtrack issue of her 1982 TV concert special

Filmography
 For Your Eyes Only (1981) – Herself in opening credit sequence
 ALF (1986–1990) – Cameo as Herself
 Sign o' the Times (1987) – Dream sequence vocalist as Herself
 The Grand Knockout Tournament - (1987) – as Herself
 Miami Vice (1987-1988) – Caitlin Davies (five episodes)
 It's Garry Shandling's Show (1988) - as Herself
 Just Say Julie (1989) – Cameo as Herself
 Indecent Proposal (1993) – Cameo as Herself
 Jack's Place (1993) – As Gwen
 Body Bags (1993) – Megan (in segment titled "Hair")
 Highlander: The Series (1993) – Annie Devlin (in episode titled "An Eye for an Eye" S02E05)
 The Adventures of Brisco County, Jr. (1993) – Crystal Hawks (one episode)
 Charles Dickens' David Copperfield (1993) – voice of Agnes
 TekWar (TV series) (1994) – War Bride
 Real Ghosts a.k.a. Haunted Lives: True Ghost Stories (1995) – Janet (nightclub owner)
 Gargoyles (1994–1997) voice – Robyn Canmore, Banshee, Molly, Finella
 The Outer Limits (1996) – Melissa McCammon in episode titled "Falling Star"
 Road Rovers (1996) voice – Groomer, Persia, Mrs. British Prime Minister
 All Dogs Go to Heaven 2 (1996), All Dogs Go to Heaven: The Series (1996 – TV series), An All Dogs Christmas Carol (1998) – voice of Sasha La Fleur
 Duckman (1997) – Betty (one episode)
 Chicken Soup for the Soul (1999) – Vicky in episode titled "Sand Castles"
 Disney's The Legend of Tarzan (2001) – voice of Dr. Robin Doyle (two episodes)
 Vegas Live! With Clint Holmes and Sheena Easton – Host (2003)
 Scooby-Doo! and the Loch Ness Monster (2004) – voice of Professor Fiona Pembrooke
 Young Blades (2005) – Queen Anne
 Phineas and Ferb (2009) – Doofenshmirtz's Girlfriend (1 episode)

Broadway/London's West End
Man of La Mancha – Aldonza (1991–1992—reprise role in 1998) (Broadway show)
Grease (1996) – Betty Rizzo (Broadway show)
42nd Street (2017–2018) – Dorothy Brock in London's (West End's Revival Production)

Concert tours and Las Vegas residencies
 Sheena Easton "World Tour" 1982
 A Private Heaven Tour 1984
 No Sound But a Heart Tour 1987 – Cancelled in US
 Sheena Easton "World Tour" 1989
 Japan "Greatest Hits" Tour 1995
 The Colors of Christmas Tour 1997–1998 – 2001 & 2003
 "At The Copa" with David Cassidy, Rio Hotel – 2000–2001
 Sheena Easton "For Your Ears Only" Las Vegas Hilton – 2002–2003
 Sheena Easton "Greatest Hits" Australian Tour 2015
 Sheena Easton "Reimagined New York State Fair concert" – 2021

Video Games
 Planescape Torment (1999) – voice of Annah-of-the-Shadows

Awards and nominations

American Music Awards

|-
! scope="row" |1982
|Sheena Easton
|Favorite Pop/Rock Female Artist
|
|}

Billboard Music Award

|-
! scope="row" |1981
|Sheena Easton
|Top Pop New Artist 
|
|-
! scope="row" |2004
|Sheena Easton
|Top Pop Artists of the Past 25 Years chart
|number 58
|}

Grammy Awards
The Grammy Awards are awarded annually by the National Academy of Recording Arts and Sciences. Easton has won two awards from six nominations.

|-
! scope="row" rowspan=2|1982
|Sheena Easton
|Best New Artist
|
|-
|"For Your Eyes Only"
|Best Female Pop Vocal Performance
|
|-
! scope="row" |1984
|"Telefone (Long Distance Love Affair)"
|Best Female Pop Vocal Performance
|
|-
! scope="row" rowspan="2"|1985
|"Strut"
|Best Female Pop Vocal Performance
|
|-
|Me Gustas Tal Como Eres (with Luis Miguel)
|Best Mexican-American Performance
|
|-
! scope="row" |1988
|"U Got the Look" (with Prince)
|Best R&B Performance by a Duo or Group with Vocal
|
|}
Note: "U Got the Look" was also nominated for the Grammy Award for Best R&B Song. This nomination is credited to the songwriter (Prince) and not to Easton.

Other awards
Best British Female Singer – 1980
Daily Mirror Pop & Rock Awards

Best Newcomer – 1980
Capital Radio

Best Female Singer – 1980
The TV Times Readers Awards

Sheena Easton
Casino Legends Hall of Fame – 2004

See also
List of artists who reached number one in the United States
List of artists who reached number one on the U.S. Dance Club Songs chart

References

External links

 
 
 
 
 

 

1959 births
Living people
People from Bellshill
Alumni of the Royal Conservatoire of Scotland
British dance musicians
Grammy Award winners
British contemporary R&B singers
Scottish emigrants to the United States
20th-century Scottish women singers
Scottish film actresses
Scottish musical theatre actresses
Scottish pop singers
Scottish rock singers
Scottish singer-songwriters
Scottish voice actresses
Spanish-language singers
EMI Records artists
MCA Records artists
Universal Music Group artists
Scottish expatriates in the United States
People with acquired American citizenship
People with multiple nationality